The Military ranks of Slovakia (1939-1945) were the military insignia used by the Slovak Republic's military and the Hlinka Guard. The Slovak Republic was a landlocked country, and therefore did not possess a navy.

Military ranks

Commissioned officer ranks
The rank insignia of commissioned officers.

Other ranks
The rank insignia of non-commissioned officers and enlisted personnel.

Corps colours

Paramilitary ranks

Commanders

Other ranks

See also
 Military ranks of Slovakia

References

Sources

External links
 

Slovakia, 1939
Military history of Slovakia